Chinese Fountain is the fourth studio album by the Southern California surf rock band The Growlers, released on September 23, 2014 by Everloving Records. The album received generally positive reviews from critics, who called it "one of the best guitar albums of the year".

Track listing

 
 Song#9 "Not the Man" – music by Kyle Mullarky

Charts

References

2014 albums
The Growlers albums